Monomeith is a bounded rural locality in Victoria, Australia,  south-east of Melbourne's central business district, located within the Shire of Cardinia local government area. Monomeith recorded a population of 69 at the 2021 census.

In 1942, during World War II, a military airfield was constructed for the air defence of Melbourne, south of Spencers Road, and is still visible using Google Earth.

History

Monomeith Post Office opened on 20 July 1900 and closed in 1969.

A railway station existed from 1890 until the late 1970s.

The site of the former airfield has been considered, as of 2015, as a site for Melbourne's third major airport for passenger jet aircraft.

See also
 City of Cranbourne – Monomeith was previously within this former local government area.

References

Shire of Cardinia